Erin Maye Quade (born March 12, 1986) is an American politician from the state of Minnesota. A member of the Democratic–Farmer–Labor (DFL) Party, she served in the Minnesota House of Representatives from 2017 to 2019. She was the DFL-endorsed candidate for lieutenant governor as Erin Murphy's running mate in 2018, and the first LGBTQ person to be endorsed on the ticket of a major Minnesota political party.

Maye Quade was elected to the Minnesota Senate in 2022. She was sworn in on January, 3, 2023.

Early life and education
Maye Quade is biracial. She graduated from Eastview High School in Apple Valley, Minnesota, in 2004, and from the University of St. Thomas in Saint Paul with a Bachelor of Arts in political science and justice and peace studies in 2008.

Career 
After college, Maye Quade became a community organizer. She worked as a staffer for U.S. Representative Keith Ellison, who encouraged her to run for office.

Minnesota House of Representatives 

In 2016, Maye Quade ran for the District 57A seat in the Minnesota House of Representatives. During the campaign, opposition operatives were accused of stalking her campaign staff so persistently that neighborhood watch committees were called in to monitor their activity. She defeated Republican nominee Ali Jimenez-Hopper in the general election, 52% to 47%; hers was one of only two House seats in Minnesota to change hands from Republican to DFL that year. She was the third Black woman to serve in the chamber.

In 2017, Maye Quade accused state legislators Dan Schoen and Tony Cornish of sexual harassment. Both members resigned from office. Following the Stoneman Douglas High School shooting, she led a 24-hour sit-in at the Minnesota House to protest its lack of action on gun control.

2018 gubernatorial campaign 

In June 2018, Minnesota gubernatorial candidate Erin Murphy chose Maye Quade as her running mate. Maye Quade received the DFL endorsement by acclamation at the Minnesota DFL convention on June 3, 2018, making her the first LGBTQ person to be endorsed on the ticket of a major Minnesota political party; at age 32, she was also one of the youngest. Maye Quade and Murphy lost the DFL primary to U.S. Representative Tim Walz and State Representative Peggy Flanagan in August 2018.

2022 Minnesota State Senate campaign 

In October 2021, Maye Quade announced her candidacy for the Minnesota Senate seat currently held by Greg Clausen.

On April 23, 2022, Maye Quade gave a campaign speech at the Minnesota Democratic–Farmer–Labor Party convention while experiencing uterine contractions before childbirth. She did not get the nomination at the convention, suspended her campaign, and delivered her daughter, Harriet, at 1 a.m. on April 24. In May, Maye Quade reentered the race. She won, and she and Clare Oumou Verbeten became the first openly LGBTQ women and first Black women elected to the Minnesota state senate.

Personal life
Maye Quade is openly gay.

Maye Quade's wife, Alyse, is the Political Director of the Minnesota Democratic–Farmer–Labor Party and the former Midwest organizing manager for Everytown for Gun Safety.

Electoral history

2016

2018

2022

References

External links

Living people
Democratic Party members of the Minnesota House of Representatives
Lesbian politicians
LGBT state legislators in Minnesota
Women state legislators in Minnesota
LGBT African Americans
African-American state legislators in Minnesota
African-American women in politics
People from Apple Valley, Minnesota
1986 births
21st-century African-American people
21st-century African-American women
20th-century African-American people
20th-century African-American women